Hsiao Bi-khim (born August 7, 1971) is a Taiwanese politician and diplomat who served as a member of the Legislative Yuan from 2002 to 2008 and again between 2012 and 2020. Since July 2020, Hsiao has been serving as the representative of the Republic of China (Taiwan) to the United States.

Born in Kōbe, Hyōgo Prefecture, Japan, Hsiao grew up in Tainan, Taiwan, before moving to the United States. She graduated from Oberlin College in 1993 and Columbia University with a master's degree in political science in 1995.

She is a member of the Democratic Progressive Party (DPP) and an important figure in DPP foreign policy circles. She formerly served as a vice president of Liberal International.

Early life and education
Hsiao was born in Kōbe, Japan, to a Taiwanese father (Hsiao Tsing-fen) and an American mother (Peggy Cooley). Raised in Tainan, Taiwan, she grew up speaking Mandarin, Hokkien, and English, and was raised in a Presbyterian family. After moving to the United States as a teenager and graduating from Montclair High School in Montclair, New Jersey, Hsiao completed her undergraduate studies at Oberlin College, receiving a bachelor's degree in East Asian studies. She continued on to graduate school at Columbia University, where she received her master's degree in political science.

Political career
In the United States, Hsiao became active with the Democratic Progressive Party (DPP) representative office in the US, serving as an activity coordinator. On returning to Taiwan, Hsiao became the party's international affairs director, and represented the party at various international conferences for over a decade.

After Chen Shui-bian took office as the President of the Republic of China in 2000, Hsiao served as his interpreter and advisor for nearly two years. Her dual US and Republic of China (Taiwan) citizenship while she was holding a government position became a political issue, and she renounced her US citizenship, as required by the Civil Servants Employment Law passed in 2000.

Legislative career
In January 2001, Hsiao announced her intention to run for the Legislative Yuan on the DPP ticket as a supplementary member representing overseas constituencies, citing her experience in international relations. She was subsequently elected in December the same year.

In the legislative elections of December 2004, Hsiao was reelected to the Legislative Yuan representing Taipei's first constituency, covering the northern districts of Xinyi, Songshan, Nangang, Neihu, Shilin, and Beitou. As a legislator, she served on the Foreign and Overseas Affairs Committee (外交及僑務委員會), the Procedure Committee (程序委員會), and the Discipline Committee (紀律委員會).

Hsiao worked on a number of issues in the legislature, notably women's rights, the rights of foreigners in Taiwan, and other human rights. Hsiao supported amending the Nationality Law to allow individuals born to at least one parent of ROC nationality to also claim ROC nationality irrespective of age, and has also proposed and cosponsored anti-discrimination and anti-domestic violence amendments to the Immigration Act. She has also been a proponent of animal rights, proposing amendments to the Animal Protection Act, and also pushed for the passage of the Sexual Harassment Prevention Act in January 2005.

In May 2005, Hsiao represented the DPP at the annual congress of Liberal International in Sofia, Bulgaria, during which she was elected a vice-president of the organization. Hsiao alleged that she and other DPP representatives were followed throughout their visit to Bulgaria by two unidentified persons sent by the People's Republic of China embassy in Sofia.

The same month, Hsiao also started a campaign to encourage Taiwanese baseball fans to write e-mails to the New York Yankees to ask them to keep Taiwanese pitcher Chien-Ming Wang at the major league level.

Hsiao was one of the DPP lawmakers targeted by some party supporters as being insufficiently loyal, with a pro-independence radio show dubbing her "Chinese Khim" (中國琴) in March 2007, charging that she was close to the DPP's former New Tide faction. Defended by some other DPP members, Hsiao was still not nominated to stand for re-election by the DPP in the January 2008 legislative elections, a move some attributed to being the result of that controversy.

Hsiao left the Legislative Yuan after her term expired on January 31, 2008. She served as spokesperson for Frank Hsieh's unsuccessful 2008 presidential campaign. She is also vice chairman of the Taiwan Tibet Exchange Foundation, a member of the board of trustees of the Taiwan Foundation for Democracy, a member of the executive committee of the Council of Asian Liberals and Democrats, and a founding member of the Taiwan Association for Women in Sport (台灣女子體育運動協會).

From 2010, Hsiao spent a decade representing the DPP in Hualien County, a strongly pro-Kuomintang conservative region. In the same year, she lost with a slim minority in a by-election, but was still regarded as having broken the "iron vote" of the Kuomintang. She then set up a Hualien service office, and continued making weekly journeys between Taipei and Hualien.

Hsiao returned to the Legislative Yuan in February 2012, elected via party list proportional representation. In 2016, Hsiao succeeded Wang Ting-son as legislator for Hualien County. In 2018, an unsuccessful recall campaign was organized against Hsiao because of her strong support for same-sex marriage legalization. Hsiao did not yield to pressure, and continued to speak out for Hualien Pride. In August 2019, she received the Democratic Progressive Party nomination to run for another term in Hualien County. She lost her seat to Fu Kun-chi in the 2020 legislative elections.

Diplomatic career
Hsiao stepped down from the Legislative Yuan upon the end of her term in 2020, and was subsequently named an adviser to the National Security Council in March 2020. That June, Hsiao was appointed Taiwan's representative to the United States. She succeeded Stanley Kao, and was the first woman to assume the role. Hsiao was sworn in to the office on 20 July 2020.

On 20 January 2021, Hsiao was officially invited to and attended the inauguration of US President Joe Biden, the first time Taiwan's US representative had officially attended a US presidential inauguration since the US broke off diplomatic relations with Taiwan in 1979. Standing in front of the US Capitol at the inauguration, she said "Democracy is our common language and freedom is our common objective."

On Taiwan National Day 2021, Hsiao threw the ceremonial first pitch before a New York Mets game, celebrating the 16th annual Mets Taiwan Day.

Personal life
Her father, Hsiao Tsing-fen, was a former president of the Tainan Theological College and Seminary.

In November 2000, The Journalist, a local tabloid magazine, wrongly claimed to have been told by Vice President Annette Lu that Hsiao was having an affair with President Chen. No evidence supported the false claim, and Lu sued the magazine for libel in civil court. The magazine was eventually ordered to apologize and issue corrections admitting it had fabricated the story.

During her political career, Hsiao and fellow legislators Cheng Li-chun and Chiu Yi-ying gained the nickname "the S.H.E of the DPP." Hsiao has been a long-time supporter of gender equality and LGBT rights in Taiwan.

Hsiao is a cat lover, saying in July 2020 that she planned to take her four cats with her when she moved to the US as Taiwan's top representative to the country. As Taiwan's envoy, she said that she would combat China’s allegedly aggressive “wolf warrior” diplomacy with her own brand of “cat warrior” diplomacy. In 2012, after Typhoon Saola, Hsiao found a stray cat in a muddy field, which she gave to Tsai Ing-wen, now President, who named it Think Think.

References

External links
 Official Website of Bi-Khim Hsiao

1971 births
Taiwan independence activists
Democratic Progressive Party Members of the Legislative Yuan
Party List Members of the Legislative Yuan
Columbia Graduate School of Arts and Sciences alumni
Oberlin College alumni
Living people
Montclair High School (New Jersey) alumni
People from Montclair, New Jersey
People from Kobe
Taiwanese people of Hoklo descent
Taiwanese Protestants
Former United States citizens
21st-century Taiwanese women politicians
Taiwanese people of American descent
Members of the 5th Legislative Yuan
Members of the 6th Legislative Yuan
Members of the 8th Legislative Yuan
Members of the 9th Legislative Yuan
Hualien County Members of the Legislative Yuan
Taipei Members of the Legislative Yuan
Representatives of Taiwan to the United States
Taiwanese women ambassadors
Taiwanese LGBT rights activists